Minuscule 176 (in the Gregory-Aland numbering), ε 301 (Soden), is a Greek minuscule manuscript of the New Testament, on parchment. Palaeographically it has been assigned to the 13th century. It has marginalia.

Description 

The codex contains the text of the four Gospels on 77 parchment leaves (size ), with two large lacunae (Matthew 1:1-10:13; John 2:1-21:25). 
The text is written in two columns per page, in 38 lines per page (size of column 17.1 by 5 cm), in dark-brown ink, the capital letters in colour.

There is also a division according to the Ammonian Sections, (no references to the Eusebian Canons).

It contains and lectionary markings at the margin for liturgical use.

Text 

The Greek text of the codex is a representative of the Byzantine text-type. Hermann von Soden included it to the textual family Kx. Aland did not place it in any Category.
According to the Claremont Profile Method it represents textual family Kx in Luke 10. In Luke 1 and Luke 20 it has mixed text. It creates textual pair with minuscule 165, related to the group 22.

History 

This codex, along with codices 173, 174, 175, and 177, was brought from the Library of the Basilian monks.

It was examined by Bianchini, Birch (about 1782), and Scholz. C. R. Gregory saw it in 1886.

It is currently housed at the Vatican Library (Vat. gr. 2113), at Rome.

See also 
 List of New Testament minuscules
 Biblical manuscript
 Textual criticism

References

Further reading 

 

Greek New Testament minuscules
13th-century biblical manuscripts
Manuscripts of the Vatican Library